Martti Juhani Miettunen (17 April 1907 – 19 January 2002), was a Finnish politician who served twice as Finland's prime minister, from 1961 to 1962 and again from 1975 to 1977.

Miettunen was born in Simo, the son of a smallholder. He studied agriculture, and worked as a farmer and an agricultural advisor before entering politics. He served in Parliament as a representative for the Agrarian Party from 1945 to 1958, and then served as Governor of the Province of Lapland from 1958 to 1973. He was awarded the honorary title of Counsellor of State in 1977.

Miettunen served as a cabinet minister for 4,300 days, the eighth-longest period of service in Finnish political history. He was also known as President Urho Kekkonen's right-hand man.

He died at the age of 94 in the Kauniainen military hospital near Helsinki in early 2002.

Cabinets
 Miettunen I Cabinet
 Miettunen II Cabinet
 Miettunen III Cabinet

References

1907 births
2002 deaths
People from Simo, Finland
People from Oulu Province (Grand Duchy of Finland)
Finnish Lutherans
Centre Party (Finland) politicians
Prime Ministers of Finland
Ministers of Transport and Public Works of Finland
Ministers of Agriculture of Finland
Ministers of Finance of Finland
Members of the Parliament of Finland (1945–48)
Members of the Parliament of Finland (1948–51)
Members of the Parliament of Finland (1951–54)
Members of the Parliament of Finland (1954–58)
20th-century Lutherans